Jaime Dayron Márquez Gutiérrez (born 11 June 1983 in Pradera, Valle del Cauca) is a Colombian javelin thrower. He competed in the javelin throw at the 2012 Summer Olympics and placed 26th with a mark of 77.59 metres.

Personal bests
Javelin throw: 80.61 m –  Bogotá, 30 June 2012

Achievements

Seasonal bests by year
2002 - 70.05
2004 - 75.30
2005 - 71.98
2008 - 76.67
2009 - 79.32
2010 - 78.38
2011 - 79.35
2012 - 80.61
2013 - 79.03
2014 - 78.02
2015 - 80.17

References

External links

Tilastopaja biography

1983 births
Living people
Colombian male javelin throwers
Olympic athletes of Colombia
Athletes (track and field) at the 2012 Summer Olympics
People from Apartadó
Athletes (track and field) at the 2015 Pan American Games
Athletes (track and field) at the 2019 Pan American Games
Pan American Games competitors for Colombia
South American Games bronze medalists for Colombia
South American Games medalists in athletics
Competitors at the 2014 South American Games
Central American and Caribbean Games silver medalists for Colombia
Competitors at the 2010 Central American and Caribbean Games
Competitors at the 2014 Central American and Caribbean Games
Central American and Caribbean Games medalists in athletics
Sportspeople from Antioquia Department
21st-century Colombian people